Jean Oury (5 March 1924 – 15 May 2014) was a French psychiatrist and psychoanalyst who helped found the school of institutional psychotherapy. He was the founder and director of the psychiatric hospital La Borde clinic at Cour-Cheverny, France where he worked until he died. He was a member of the Freudian School of Paris, founded by Jacques Lacan from inception until its dissolution. His brother, Fernand Oury, founded the school of institutional pedagogy.

References
Robcis, Camille (2021) Disalienation: Politics, Philosophy, and Radical Psychiatry in Postwar France The University of Chicago Press

1924 births
French psychoanalysts
French psychiatrists
2014 deaths
Analysands of Jacques Lacan